This is a list of Elissa's music videos.

Official music videos

References

External links
Official website

Videographies of Lebanese artists